This is a list of notable Brazilian poets.

A
 Adalgisa Nery
 Adélia Prado
 Ademir Antonio Bacca
 Affonso Romano de Sant'Anna
 Afonso Schmidt
 Alberto de Oliveira
 Alphonsus de Guimaraens
 Alvarenga Peixoto
 Álvares de Azevedo (18311852)
 Amália dos Passos Figueiroa
 Ana Paula Arendt 
 Ana Cristina César
 Artur de Azevedo
 Augusto de Campos
 Augusto dos Anjos
 Augusto Meyer

B
 Basílio da Gama
 Berta Celeste Homem de Melo

C
 Carlos Drummond de Andrade
 Carlos Nejar
 Cassiano Ricardo
 Castro Alves
 Casimiro de Abreu
 Cecília Meireles
 Cláudio Manuel da Costa
 Coelho Neto
 Cora Coralina
 Cruz e Sousa

D
 Décio Pignatari

E
 Eduardo Kac
 Eli Heil

F
 Ferreira Gullar
 Frederico Barbosa

G
 Gregório de Matos
 Gonçalves Dias
 Gustavo Dourado

H
 Haroldo de Campos

J
 João Cabral de Melo Neto
 João Guimarães Rosa
 Jorge de Lima
 Julia da Costa
 Junqueira Freire
 Júlio Prestes

K
 Kátya Chamma

L
 Laurindo Rabelo
 Lourdes Teodoro
 Lupe Cotrim

M
 Machado de Assis
 Manuel Bandeira
 Márcio-André
 Mário de Andrade
 Menotti del Picchia
 Murilo Mendes
 Mario Quintana

O
 Olavo Bilac
 Oswald de Andrade

P
 Paulo Leminski

R
 Raimundo Arruda Sobrinho
 Raimundo Correia
 Raul Bopp
 Ricardo Domeneck
 Roberto Piva
 Ronald de Carvalho

S
 Santa Rita Durão

T

 Taiguara
 Tomás Antônio Gonzaga
 Torquato Neto

V
 Vicente de Carvalho
 Vinícius de Moraes

W
 Waly Salomão

See also

 Portuguese Poetry
 Portuguese literature

Brazilian poets
Brazil
Poets